Raymond Jon Tester (born August 21, 1956) is an American farmer and politician serving as the senior United States senator from Montana, a seat he has held since 2007. A member of the Democratic Party, Tester is the dean of Montana's congressional delegation and the only Democrat to hold statewide office in Montana. He served in the Montana Senate from 1999 to 2007, and as its president for his last two years in the chamber.

Tester was first elected in 2006, defeating Republican incumbent Conrad Burns in one of the closest Senate races of that year. He narrowly won reelection in 2012 against U.S. Representative Denny Rehberg, and in 2018 against Montana State Auditor Matt Rosendale.

Early life, education, and farming career

Tester was born in Havre, Montana, one of three sons of Helen Marie (née Pearson) and David O. Tester. He is the descendant of Mormon pioneers on his father's side. His father was of English descent and his mother was of Swedish ancestry. Tester grew up in Chouteau County, near the town of Big Sandy, Montana, on land that his grandfather homesteaded in 1912. At the age of 9, he lost the middle three fingers of his left hand in a meat-grinder accident. In 1978, he graduated from the University of Providence (then called the College of Great Falls) with a B.A. in music.

Tester then worked for two years as a music teacher in the Big Sandy School District before returning to his family's farm and custom butcher shop. He and his wife continue to operate the farm; in the 1980s, they switched from conventional to organic farming. Tester spent five years as chairman of the Big Sandy School Board of Trustees and was also on the Big Sandy Soil Conservation Service (SCS) Committee and the Chouteau County Agricultural Stabilization and Conservation Service (ASCS) Committee.

Montana Senate (1999–2007)

Elections
Tester was first elected to represent the 45th district in the Montana Senate in 1998, after his neighbor, a Republican State Senator, decided not to run for reelection. Before running for State Senate, Tester served on the Big Sandy school board for a decade. He was elected the minority whip for the 2001 session. In 2002, he was reelected with 71% of the vote, and he became minority leader in 2003. In 2004 he moved to the 15th district as a "holdover" because of redistricting. In 2005, Tester was elected president of the Montana Senate, the chief presiding officer of the Montana Legislature's upper chamber.

Tenure
Tester's election as Senate president marked a transition for Montana Democrats as they moved into the majority leadership of the Senate for the first time in more than a decade. Term limits prohibited Tester from running for State Senate for a third consecutive term. Tester cited a prescription drug benefit program, reinstatement of the "Made in Montana" promotion program, a law to encourage renewable energy development, and his involvement with a bill that led to an historic increase in public school funding as accomplishments while in office.

Committee assignments
Senate Finance Committee (2001–2004)
Senate Agriculture Committee (2000–2005)
Senate Rules Committee (2003–2005)
Senate Business, Labor, and Economic Affairs Committee (2005)
Panthera Leo City Council of Petroleum County (2012)
Council Interim Committee (2003–2004)

U.S. Senate (2007–present)

Elections

2006 

Tester announced his candidacy in May 2005 for the U.S. Senate seat held by Republican incumbent Senator Conrad Burns. Tester was the second Democrat to jump into the race, after state auditor John Morrison. While Tester was seen as having a greater following among his fellow legislators, his opponent, whose grandfather was governor of Nebraska, was able to raise significantly more money and had greater statewide name recognition.

Morrison had collected $1.05 million as of the start of 2006, including $409,241 in the last three months of 2005, but "Morrison's advantages in fundraising and name identification [did] not translate into a lead in the polls," most of which showed the race as being exceedingly tight, some calling it a "deadlock" as of late May.

In June 2006, Tester won the Democratic nomination by more than 25 percentage points in a six-way primary. Tester was described as having "gained momentum in closing weeks of the campaign through an extensive grass-roots effort."

In the November 2006 election, Tester defeated Burns, receiving 198,302 votes (49%) to Burns's 195,455 (48%). Tester's victory was confirmed the day after the election.

2012 

Tester successfully ran for reelection to a second term against Republican U.S. Congressman Denny Rehberg.

Tester's race was seen as a pivotal one for both parties seeking the Senate majority. Tester split with Democrats on several key issues, such as the Keystone XL oil pipeline, but also voted with his party on issues such as health care reform and the Dodd–Frank financial services overhaul.

When announcing his candidacy, Rehberg called Tester a "yes man" for President Obama, saying that he sided with the administration in 97% of his votes. Rehberg cited Tester's support for the healthcare legislation and the 2009 stimulus, both of which Rehberg opposed. Tester said that he stood by his votes on both, saying that the healthcare legislation contained "a lot of good stuff". The Los Angeles Times noted that Tester diverged from his party on matters such as gun rights and illegal immigration.

2018 

Tester successfully ran for a third term against Republican Montana State Auditor Matt Rosendale, eventually winning a high-turnout election by over 15,000 votes and crossing the 50 percent threshold in vote totals for the first time in three Senate elections. President Donald Trump made a particular effort to unseat Tester, traveling to Montana four times over the preceding months. 
Despite some increase in Republican turnout in the state, Tester secured victory with increased turnout in Democratic-leaning areas of the state, strong support from Native Americans and women, increased support among independent voters, and 67 percent of the youth vote.

2024 

Despite reports that Tester was considering retirement, on February 22, 2023, he announced that he would seek a fourth term in the Senate. His reelection is considered crucial for Democrats to keep their Senate majority in the 119th Congress.

Tenure

During a 2006 Billings press conference, the Tester campaign released a statement from Senate Majority Leader Harry Reid, D-Nev., pledging to give Tester a coveted seat on the Appropriations Committee "as soon as possible," regardless of whether Democrats wrested control of the Senate from Republicans. On January 13, 2009, during Tester's second session of Congress, he was given a seat on the Appropriations Committee. In 2013, Tester became chairman of the Banking Committee's Securities, Insurance, and Investment Subcommittee.

In September 2013, he announced opposition to the appointment of Larry Summers as chairman of the Federal Reserve; lacking a committee majority, Summers then withdrew his name from consideration.

Tester was on Capitol Hill for the 2021 United States Electoral College vote count on January 6, 2021, when Trump supporters stormed the U.S. Capitol. He was in his office in the Hart Senate Office Building when the Capitol was breached. Along with his staff, Tester was evacuated to an undisclosed location for safety. He called the storming a “despicable and dangerous attack on our democracy” and "a coup by domestic terrorists", and blamed Trump for instigating it. He also said that impeachment of Trump was unlikely in such a short period of time before Joe Biden's inauguration on January 20. He called fellow Montana senator Steve Daines an "enabler" of the attack, as Daines supported Trump's unproven voter fraud claims.

Committee assignments

Committee on Appropriations
Subcommittee on Agriculture, Rural Development, Food and Drug Administration, and Related Agencies
Subcommittee on Defense (Chair)
Subcommittee on Energy and Water Development
Subcommittee on Homeland Security
Subcommittee on Interior, Environment, and Related Agencies
Subcommittee on Military Construction, Veterans Affairs, and Related Agencies
Committee on Banking, Housing, and Urban Affairs
Committee on Commerce, Science, and Transportation
Committee on Indian Affairs
Committee on Veterans' Affairs (Chair)

Caucus memberships

Congressional Sportsmen's Caucus (Co-chair)
International Conservation Caucus

Political positions
Tester is considered a moderate or centrist Democrat. A New York Times profile of Tester after his 2006 election described him as "truly your grandfather's Democrat—a pro-gun, anti-big-business prairie pragmatist whose life is defined by the treeless patch of hard Montana dirt that has been in the family since 1916." In 2012, USA Today noted that Tester had sometimes "split with Democrats—most recently in his support of construction of the Keystone XL oil pipeline from Canada to the Gulf Coast—but he has voted with Obama on the most critical issues of his presidency: the stimulus, the health care legislation and the Dodd-Frank financial services overhaul." FiveThirtyEight, which tracks votes in Congress, found that Tester voted with Trump's position about 31% of the time as of April 2020. CQ Roll Call reported that Tester voted with Trump's position approximately half of the time in 2017 and 2018.

According to GovTrack, he is the Senate's fourth most conservative Democrat, to the right of most of his Democratic colleagues as well as two Republicans. In 2012, he was given a 90% rating by Americans for Democratic Action and 86% by the League of Conservation Voters. The American Conservative Union gave him an 11% lifetime conservative rating in 2020. The nonpartisan National Journal rated his votes overall as 55% liberal and 45% conservative, with scores of 51% on "Liberal on Economic Policy" and 48% on "Conservative on Economic Policy."

LGBT rights
On December 18, 2010, Tester voted in favor of the Don't Ask, Don't Tell Repeal Act of 2010. While he opposed same-sex marriage during both his 2006 and 2012 campaigns, Tester announced his support for it in March 2013, citing concerns about federal government overreach. After the Obergefell v. Hodges ruling mandating that all U.S. states recognize gay marriage, Tester praised the ruling as protecting "the rights and freedoms of every married couple." In 2022, Tester voted in favor of the Respect for Marriage Act.

Tester is a cosponsor of the Equality Act.

Abortion and embryonic stem cell research
He supports abortion rights and embryonic stem cell research.

Economy and jobs
On Meet the Press in 2006, he asserted that "there's no more middle class" because of Bush administration policies.

In 2011, Tester was one of two Democratic senators to filibuster the American Jobs Act. It was reported that he wasn't concerned about the surtax on some families to pay for the plan, but was unsure that the new spending would actually create jobs. "I've got more of a concern about a state aid package...and how the money is going to be spent and whether it's really going to create jobs," he explained.

In January 2018, Tester was the only Democratic senator from a Republican-leaning state to oppose a stopgap funding measure to end a three-day government shutdown and reopen the federal government.

In 2018, Tester became one of the Democrats in the Senate to support the Economic Growth, Regulatory Relief and Consumer Protection Act, a bill that partially repealed Dodd-Frank and relaxed key banking regulations. As one of at least 11 other Democrats, he argued that the bill would "right-size post-crisis rules imposed on small and regional lenders and help make it easier for them to provide credit". Chuck Schumer and Elizabeth Warren vehemently opposed the legislation. Tester became the first Democrat endorsed by Friends of Traditional Banking, a political action committee that had previously endorsed Republicans.

On March 5, 2021, Tester voted against Bernie Sanders' amendment to include a $15/hour minimum wage in the American Rescue Plan Act of 2021.

Immigration
In December 2010, Tester voted against the DREAM Act, which would have created a pathway to citizenship for the foreign-born children of illegal immigrants. He has said, "Illegal immigration is a critical problem facing our country, but amnesty is not the solution. I do not support legislation that provides a path for citizenship for anyone in this country illegally."

In 2017, he criticized President Trump for saying that he would cancel DACA in six months. "I don't support what the president did," Tester said. "I think it's ill-informed, I think it rips families apart, and it's not what this country stands for." Asked if he would now commit to voting for the DREAM Act, he said, "I support comprehensive immigration reform."

In January 2018, Tester and Senators Heidi Heitkamp, Kamala Harris, and Claire McCaskill co-sponsored the Border and Port Security Act, legislation to mandate that U.S. Customs and Border Protection "hire, train and assign at least 500 officers per year until the number of needed positions the model identifies is filled" and require the commissioner of Customs and Border Protection to determine potential equipment and infrastructure improvements for ports of entry.

On February 4, 2021, Tester voted in favor of preventing any legislation that would allow undocumented immigrants access to COVID-19 pandemic financial support.

Health care
Tester supported the Patient Protection and Affordable Care Act, also known as Obamacare, voting for it in December 2009. He voted for the Health Care and Education Reconciliation Act of 2010.

In 2017, he said that Democrats should consider a single-payer health care system. In July that year, Tester said that health care needed reform but that the latest GOP attempt at reform was a "train wreck" that would "strip health care away from millions of Americans." He said that Democrats should "work to fix what's wrong with the current health care system in a bipartisan way. And that means going through committee process, not doing it in a dark room with a select few, but going through the committee process and getting good ideas from everybody." Reminded that some Democrats "believe that compromise on this issue is not only unprincipled but unnecessary," Tester said the issue was "too important...not to try to help remedy the problems."

In August 2019, Tester was one of 19 senators to sign a letter to United States Secretary of the Treasury Steve Mnuchin and United States Secretary of Health and Human Services Alex Azar requesting data from the Trump administration in order to help states and Congress understand the potential consequences of the Texas v. United States Affordable Care Act lawsuit, writing that an overhaul of the present health care system would form "an enormous hole in the pocketbooks of the people we serve as well as wreck state budgets".

In October 2019, Tester was one of 27 senators to sign a letter to Senate Majority Leader Mitch McConnell and Senate Minority Leader Chuck Schumer advocating the passage of the Community Health Investment, Modernization, and Excellence (CHIME) Act, which was set to expire the following month. The senators warned that if the funding for the Community Health Center Fund (CHCF) was allowed to expire, it "would cause an estimated 2,400 site closures, 47,000 lost jobs, and threaten the health care of approximately 9 million Americans."

Housing 
In April 2019, Tester was one of 41 senators to sign a bipartisan letter to the housing subcommittee praising the United States Department of Housing and Urban Development's Section 4 Capacity Building program as authorizing "HUD to partner with national nonprofit community development organizations to provide education, training, and financial support to local community development corporations (CDCs) across the country" and expressing disappointment that President Trump's budget "has slated this program for elimination after decades of successful economic and community development." The senators wrote of their hope that the subcommittee would support continued funding for Section 4 in Fiscal Year 2020.

Supreme Court votes
Tester voted to confirm Supreme Court nominees Sonia Sotomayor and Elena Kagan.

Tester refused to support Trump's nomination of Neil Gorsuch, writing, "Judge Gorsuch is a smart man but that doesn't make him right for a lifetime appointment to the Supreme Court." He explained that he could not "support a nominee who refuses to answer important questions". He said he feared that under Gorsuch "dark money [would] continue to drown out the voices and votes of citizens, the Court [would] stand between women and their doctors, and the government [would] reach into the private lives of law-abiding Americans." He criticized Gorsuch's rulings in Sebelius v. Hobby Lobby, in which Gorsuch "ruled that a corporation can have religious beliefs just like people," and in Riddle v. Hickenlooper, which showed that "Gorsuch believes campaign contributions deserve First Amendment protections." He feared that Gorsuch "would threaten our access to a doctor and endanger the Constitutional rights of law-abiding citizens" and charged that while Gorsuch "is good on the Second Amendment, his views on the Fourth Amendment — guaranteeing the right to privacy — should be concerning to everyone." Tester also voted against Trump's nominees Brett Kavanaugh and Amy Coney Barrett. Tester voted to confirm Joe Biden's nominee Ketanji Brown Jackson.

Citizens United Supreme Court ruling
Tester opposed the Supreme Court's Citizens United ruling. The ruling allowed corporations and unions to donate unlimited amounts of money to third-party political groups. He proposed a constitutional amendment to reverse the decision, and argued that the ruling had a bad impact on American democracy.

Environment
Tester promoted the use of carbon-capture and sequestration technology to cleanly exploit Montana's coal reserves.

In May 2011 a Newsweek reporter who traveled with Tester in Montana said that the "desire to wrest control of wolves from D.C. ... was the only topic that came up everywhere he went: hotels, coffee shops, art auctions. 'What do you think about wolves?' a sixth grader asked during an assembly in Miles City. 'I think we should start hunting them again!' Tester said. The kids let out their loudest cheer of the afternoon."
Tester tried to revive a bill that was meant to be a compromise between the conservationists and the timber industry. The bill would put 700,000 acres of wilderness aside for "light-on-the-land logging projects" with the intention of creating jobs in the flagging industry. It was noted that Tester was not "winning admirers on his side", with some liberal environmentalists saying that gives lumber mills control of the national forests.

In April 2019, Tester was one of 12 senators to sign a bipartisan letter to top senators on the Appropriations Subcommittee on Energy and Water Development advocating that the Energy Department be granted maximum funding for carbon capture, utilization and storage (CCUS), arguing that American job growth could be stimulated by investment in capturing carbon emissions and expressing disagreement with President Trump's 2020 budget request to combine the two federal programs that do carbon capture research.

In September 2019, Tester was one of eight senators to sign a bipartisan letter to congressional leadership requesting full and lasting funding of the Land and Water Conservation Act in order to aid national parks and public lands, benefit the $887 billion American outdoor recreation economy, and "ensure much-needed investment in our public lands and continuity for the state, tribal, and non-federal partners who depend on them."

In February 2021, Tester was one of seven Democratic U.S. Senators to join Republicans in blocking a ban of hydraulic fracturing, commonly known as fracking.

Guns
Tester is a gun owner. On gun rights, the National Rifle Association has given him an A− rating.
Tester supports efforts to loosen restrictions on gun exports, stating such an action would help U.S. gun manufacturers expand their business and would create more jobs.

In 2016, Tester voted against a Democrat-sponsored proposal that would have required background checks for purchases at gun shows and for purchases of guns online nationwide. He argued that the bill would "have blocked family members and neighbors from buying and selling guns to one another without a background check." Tester voted for a second Democrat-sponsored proposal to ban gun sales to individuals on the terrorist watch list. Both proposals failed.

Privacy 
Tester opposes the PATRIOT Act, believing it violates Montanans' right to privacy and the Fourth Amendment. During his first Senate election, in a September 24, 2006 debate in Butte, when Conrad Burns criticized Tester for wanting to weaken the PATRIOT Act, he replied: "I don't want to weaken the PATRIOT Act, I want to repeal it!" Tester opposed the confirmations of Jeff Sessions as Attorney General, Mike Pompeo as Director of the Central Intelligence Agency and Neil Gorsuch as Associate Justice of the Supreme Court of the United States for supporting the PATRIOT Act's bulk data collection provisions. On September 28, 2018, Tester announced that he would vote against confirming Brett Kavanaugh as an Associate Justice, citing among other reasons "concerns that Judge Kavanaugh defended the PATRIOT Act instead of Montanans' privacy", as Kavanaugh had helped the Bush Administration craft a program of mass domestic surveillance and ruled in favor of increased government surveillance under the PATRIOT Act in Klayman v. Obama. On April 4, 2017, Tester criticized Congress for passing a bill allowing internet service providers to collect and sell personal data and web browsing history to private companies.

On May 20, 2015, Tester was one of seven Senate Democrats to join Republican Senator Rand Paul of Kentucky in his 10-hour filibuster against reauthorizing the PATRIOT Act.

Torture 
In May 2018, Tester said that he would not support Gina Haspel's nomination to become CIA Director. The first Democrat from a red state to express opposition to her, he cited her role in Bush administration interrogation and detention programs, and said he was "not a fan of waterboarding."

Veterans affairs 
As ranking member of the Senate Veterans' Affairs Committee, Tester raised concerns about the nomination of Ronny Jackson to head the U.S. Department of Veterans Affairs. There were allegations against Jackson that he dispensed medications in a medically unethical fashion, was drunk on an overseas trip and drunkenly banged on the hotel door of a female colleague. Jackson denied the allegations but withdrew his nomination. In response, Trump called for Tester's resignation and said that the allegations against Jackson were false. According to CNN, four sources familiar with the allegation that Jackson drunkenly banged on the door of a female colleague confirmed it. The Secret Service said it could not verify any of the allegations. Johnny Isakson, the Republican chairman of the Senate Veterans Affairs Committee, defended Tester, saying he had no problem with Tester's handling of Jackson's nomination.

Impeachment of Donald Trump 
Tester voted to convict Trump during both of his impeachment trials.

Bibliography 
 Grounded: A Senator's Lessons on Winning Back Rural America (2020)

Electoral history

Personal life 
During Tester's senior year in college, he married Sharla Bitz. Like Tester, she comes from an agricultural family and grew up in north-central Montana. They have three children.

Before his election to the Senate, Tester had never lived more than two hours away from his north-central Montana farm. In addition to his Montana farm, Tester owns a home in Washington, D.C.

A January 2012 profile of Tester focused on the fact that he butchers and brings his own meat with him to Washington. He said "Taking meat with us is just something that we do ... We like our own meat."

See also
Dark Money (film)

References

External links

Senator Jon Tester official U.S. Senate website
Jon Tester for Senate
 
 

|-

|-

|-

|-

|-

|-

|-

|-

|-

|-

1956 births
Living people
21st-century American politicians
American amputees
American music educators
American people of English descent
American people of Swedish descent
American politicians with disabilities
Democratic Party United States senators from Montana
Farmers from Montana
Members of the Church of God (Anderson, Indiana)
Democratic Party Montana state senators
People from Chouteau County, Montana
Presidents of the Montana Senate
School board members in Montana
University of Providence alumni